Zander James Ragnar Fagerson (born 19 January 1996) is a Scottish international rugby union player who plays for Glasgow Warriors in the United Rugby Championship. His regular playing position is Prop.

Rugby union career

Amateur career

Fagerson was drafted to Stirling County in the Scottish Premiership for the 2017-18 season.

Professional career

Fagerson made his debut for Glasgow Warriors in a 40–23 win at Treviso in October 2014 going on to become the youngest player to reach 50 caps for Glasgow Warriors at the age of 21.

International career

Fagerson represented Scotland at under-16, under-18 and under-20.

Fagerson received his first call up to the senior Scotland squad by coach Vern Cotter on 19 January 2016 for the 2016 Six Nations Championship.
He made his debut for Scotland as a replacement in the Six Nations match against England at Murrayfield on 6 February 2016.

British and Irish Lions

In May 2021 Fagerson was selected in the 37-man squad for the 2021 British & Irish Lions tour to South Africa.

Fagerson took to the field for the first tour match against the Sigma Lions at Ellis Park Stadium in Johannesburg, becoming Lion #848.

International statistics

Coaching career

From the 2019-20 season Fagerson will be an assistant coach at Glasgow High Kelvinside.

Outside of rugby

Outside rugby, Fagerson was Scottish Youth Downhill Mountain Bike Champion in 2010, sang with NYCoS National Boys Choir in 2006 and is a qualified lifeguard.

Fagerson is known affectionately as "Zandbags" amongst Scottish rugby fans due to his love of getting involved in any afters.

References

External links
 
 Glasgow Warriors profile
 Scotland profile

1996 births
Living people
Scottish rugby union coaches
Scottish rugby union players
People educated at the High School of Dundee
People educated at Strathallan School
Glasgow Warriors players
Scotland international rugby union players
Stirling County RFC players
British & Irish Lions rugby union players from Scotland
Rugby union players from Perth, Scotland